Robert Christian Eckhardt (July 16, 1913 – November 13, 2001) was a Democratic United States Representative representing the 8th District of Texas from 1967 to 1981.

Early life and family
Eckhardt was born in Austin, Texas on July 16, 1913. He was the grand-nephew of Democratic Congressman Rudolph Kleberg, nephew of Republican Congressman Harry Wurzbach, and a cousin of Richard Mifflin Kleberg, Sr., heir to the famous King Ranch in South Texas. Eckhardt graduated from the University of Texas at Austin in 1935 and received his law degree from the University of Texas Law School in 1939. He served in the United States Army from 1942 to 1944. Eckhardt was appointed Southwestern Director of the Office of the Coordinator of Inter-American Affairs, 1944–1945.

Political career
He moved to Houston, Texas and was elected a member of the Texas House of Representatives, serving from 1958 to 1966, where he compiled a fairly liberal voting record.  One of Eckhardt's most enduring accomplishments in the Texas House was writing the Texas Open Beaches Act, passed in 1959.

In 1966, he was elected as a Democrat in Congress representing Texas's 8th congressional district, which included most of northern Houston. Eckhardt was the sponsor of the War Powers Act and the Toxic Substances Act. He was reelected six times without serious difficulty.  In 1980, however, he was narrowly defeated by Jack Fields, losing by only 4,900 votes. He was also a co-founder of the Texas Observer magazine.

Eckhardt died on November 13, 2001, in Austin, Texas. He was interred in Austin Memorial Park Cemetery.

Books authored
 Eckhardt, Bob. The Tides of Power: Conversations on the American Constitution between Bob Eckhardt, Member of Congress from Texas, and Charles L. Black Jr., Sterling Professor of Law, Yale University (New Haven: Yale University Press, 1976)

References

External links

Keith, Gary A. Eckhardt:There Once was a Congressman from Texas (Austin: University of Texas Press, 2007) 
 Robert C. Eckhardt Papers, 1931–1992, Center for American History, The University of Texas at Austin
 

1913 births
2001 deaths
People from Austin, Texas
Military personnel from Texas
Democratic Party members of the Texas House of Representatives
University of Texas School of Law alumni
Democratic Party members of the United States House of Representatives from Texas
20th-century American politicians
Kleberg family